Chengguan District is one of 5 districts of the prefecture-level city of Lanzhou, the capital of Gansu Province, China. It is located mostly on the southern side of the Yellow River, and  includes the downtown Lanzhou. Both the Gansu provincial government capitol and that of Lanzhou prefecture-level city are located within the district. The Lanzhou Railway Station is also located in this district.

History 

The area has been inhabited by Qiang since the Xia dynasty (2070 BC). In 215 BC, Meng Tian captured the area south of the Yellow River from Hu barbarians and Yuzhong County was established at the current location of Donggang Subdistrict in Chengguan. In 581, the area was known as Wuquan County, renamed to Jincheng County in 671.

By the Tang dynasty, Chengguan became the seat of the Zhou ('province'), Commandery and County. In 1104 it was known as Lanquan County. By 1369, Lanzhou, then called Lan County, became subordinate under Lintao County.

In 1399 the city walls of Lanzhou were built.

In 1666, the governor of Gansu moved back to Lanzhou. In 1764 the administrative centers moved back to Chengguan, then known as Gaolan County. In 1941 present day Gaolan County was spun off and the modern Chengguan District was established, which then encompassed the entire urban area of Lanzhou. Since 1955 the district is named Chengguan, named after the old city centre of Lanzhou. During the Cultural Revolution it was named Dongfeng District (东风区).

In 2005 all towns were abolished and since then the district is divided in subdistricts only.

Administrative divisions 

The district is divided in 25 subdistricts:

See also 
 List of administrative divisions of Gansu

References

External links 
 

Chengguan District
Geography of Lanzhou